The Hellespontus Montes is a mountain range on Mars. It stretches 711 km from north to south. It is in the Noachis quadrangle and the southeasternmost area of Noachis Terra, and is located midway between the highland area of Noachis and the impact basin Hellas Planitia. The mountains are named after a Classical albedo feature.

References

Mountains on Mars
Noachis quadrangle